King is a 1998 Indian Kannada language film directed by Srikanth Kulkarni. Tiger Prabhakar wrote the film's story and screenplay and also stars as the lead actor alongside Arun Pandian, Rajeshwari, Vichithra, Anju and Jyothi Meena. Dheerendra Gopal, Sundar Raj, Prithviraj, H. G. Dattatreya feature in supporting roles.

Cast

Reception 
Srikanth Srinivasa of Deccan Herald, gave the film a negative review and wrote that it "is a disaster from the word go." He wrote, "Prabhakar is irritating and hopelessly annoying" and that the film "defies all logic and comprehension." he concluded writing, "Atrocious and disgusting fare!"

References 

1998 films
1990s Kannada-language films